Following is a list of notable dive bars:

 The 5 Point Cafe – Seattle, Washington
 Ace's & Deuce's Lounge – Pittsburgh, Pennsylvania
 Blue Moon Tavern – Seattle
 The Cock – New York City
 Comet Tavern – Seattle
 Dockside Saloon and Restaurant – Portland, Oregon
 Donnie Vegas – Portland, Oregon
 Dry Creek Café & Boat Dock – Austin, Texas
 Georgies – Asbury Park, New Jersey
 Holman's Bar and Grill – Portland, Oregon
 Joe's Cellar – Portland, Oregon
 Kelly's Olympian – Portland, Oregon
 The Know – Portland, Oregon
 Linda's Tavern – Seattle
 Low Brow Lounge – Portland, Oregon
 Marie's Crisis – New York City
 The Matador – Portland, Oregon
 Mecca Cafe, Seattle
 Metropolitan – New York City
 My Father's Place – Portland, Oregon
 Nacho Borracho – Seattle
 Nite Hawk Cafe and Lounge, Portland, Oregon
 Pal's Shanty Tavern – Portland, Oregon
 Palmer's Bar – Minneapolis, Minnesota
 Patty's Inn – San Jose, California
 Pink Feather – Portland, Oregon
 Reel M Inn – Portland, Oregon
 Shanghai Tunnel Bar – Portland, Oregon
 Space Room Lounge and Genie's Too – Portland, Oregon
 Tom's Restaurant and Bar – Portland, Oregon
 Venice Tavern – Baltimore, Maryland
 Yamhill Pub – Portland, Oregon
 Zach's Shack – Portland, Oregon

Dive bars